The Taipei Representative Office in the Federal Republic of Germany; represents the interests of Taiwan in Germany in the absence of formal diplomatic relations, functioning as a de facto embassy.

Based in Berlin, it also has offices in Frankfurt, Hamburg and Munich. Its counterpart in Taiwan is the German Institute Taipei.

History
The Republic of China was a winning power of World War II and thus dispatched a military mission to occupied Berlin. However, it did not re-establish diplomatic ties with either East or West Germany after the war. Its first in-official office was established in 1956 in Bad Godesberg in Bonn in the then West Germany as the Freichina- Presse und Informationsdienst ("Free China Press and Information Service"), later in 1972 becoming the Büro der Fernost-Informationen ("Far East Information Office").

In 1992, it became the Taipei Wirtschafts- und Kulturbüro or "Taipei Economic and Cultural Office".
In 1997, it adopted its present name. In October  1999, the Taipei Representative Office moved to Berlin, and offices in Frankfurt, Hamburg and Munich were established.

Representatives
 Agnes Hwa-Yue Chen 
  (incumbent since 2016)

References

External links
 Taipeh Vertretung in der Bundesrepublik Deutschland

Germany
1956 establishments in West Germany
Diplomatic missions in Berlin
Organizations established in 1972
Germany–Taiwan relations